The 2009–10 Leinster Rugby season was Leinster's ninth competing in the Celtic League which they finished runners up in, alongside which they were competing in the 2009–10 Heineken Cup as defending champions until they were knocked out at the semi-finals by Stade Toulousain who went on to win the competition.

Squad

Coaching and management team

Transfers

In

Out

Pre-Season Results

2009–10 Magners League Fixtures/Results
{| class="wikitable"
|+ Key to colours
|-
|bgcolor="#ffffcc"|    
| Magners League Semi-Final
|-
|bgcolor="#d8ffec"|    
| Magners League Final
|}

League table
{| class="wikitable"
|+ Key to colours
|-
|bgcolor=#d8ffeb|    
| Top four teams advance to playoffs.
|}

Heineken Cup Fixtures/Results

Pool Table

Knock-out stage

External links
Official Leinster website

2009–10
2009–10 Celtic League by team
2009–10 in Irish rugby union
2009–10 Heineken Cup by team